NNN may refer to:

Arts and entertainment 
 Neal 'n' Nikki, a 2005 Indian movie directed by Arjun Sablok and starring Uday Chopra and Tanisha
 NNN, the production code for the 1972 Doctor Who serial The Mutants

Companies and organizations 
 National Numeracy Network (NNN), a professional organization that promotes numeracy in the United States
 National Retail Properties (ticker symbol: NNN), a real estate investment trust in the United States
 Norsk Naerings- og Nytelsesmiddelarbeiderforbund, the Norwegian Union of Food, Beverage and Allied Workers

News 
 NAM News Network, a news network set up by non-aligned countries
 Newspaper National Network, a marketing partnership of the top 25 newspaper companies in America and the Newspaper Association of America
 Nippon News Network, the Japanese television news network
 Norddeutsche Neueste Nachrichten, a German newspaper
 Nine News Now
 National Nine Network, former name of the Nine Network
 National Nine News, former name of Nine News

Other uses 
 N-Nitrosonornicotine, a nitrosamine carcinogen found in tobacco
 Naomi Nari Nam, a figure skater often referred to by her initials
 New Nordic Norm, a type of binding for cross-country (Nordic) skis
 nnn (file manager), a free text-based file manager for Unix-like systems
 NNN Lease (triple net lease), a lease agreement in which the renter is responsible for paying property taxes, insurance, and maintenance charges
 No Nut November, an Internet challenge
 The "Disconnect" command code in Telex usage; by extension, "stop" in other uses

See also 
 \nnn (disambiguation)